Pethia lutea, the citron barb, is a species of cyprinid fish native to India where it is found in Maharashtra, India.  This species can reach a length of  SL.

References 

Pethia
Fish of India
Taxa named by Mandar S. Paingankar
Taxa named by Neelesh Dahanukar
Taxa named by Rajeev Raghavan
Fish described in 2014